This is a list of members of the Queensland Legislative Council from 1 January 1910 to 31 December 1916. Appointments, made by the Governor of Queensland, were for life, although many members for one reason or another resigned.

The Labor Party had a major win in the Legislative Assembly at the 1915 election, and proceeded with their stated goal of abolishing the Legislative Council by introducing legislation to that effect in 1916, which of course was defeated by the non-Labor majority Council. By the end of 1916, the membership had fallen from 44 to 37 members as the government had only appointed one new member in two years.

Office bearers

President of the Legislative Council:
 Arthur Morgan (19 January 1906 – 19 December 1916)

Chairman of Committees:
 Peter MacPherson (6 August 1907 – 12 September 1913)
 William Taylor (30 September 1913 – 16 November 1920)

Members

Members shaded red were Labor Party members of the Council.

 Arthur Hawthorn resigned on 22 March 1912, and was reappointed on 1 July 1912.
 Thomas Cribb and Edward Barrow Forrest had served previous terms on the Council.

References

 Waterson, Duncan Bruce: Biographical Register of the Queensland Parliament 1860-1929 (second edition), Sydney 2001.
 Alphabetical Register of Members (Queensland Parliament)

Members of Queensland parliaments by term
20th-century Australian politicians